The Alamuchee-Bellamy Covered Bridge is a county-owned wooden covered bridge that spans the northeast corner of Duck Pond in Sumter County, Alabama, United States.  It is located on the campus of the University of West Alabama behind Reed Hall, which is off Student Union Drive in the city of Livingston.

Built in 1861, the 88-foot (27-meter) bridge is a Town's  lattice truss construction over a single span.  Its World Guide to Covered Bridges number is 01-60-01.  The Alamuchee-Bellamy Covered Bridge is currently eligible for addition to the National Register of Historic Places.  It is one of the oldest covered bridges still existing in Alabama; it is maintained by the Sumter County Historical Society.

History
The bridge was originally designed and constructed over the Sucarnoochee River by Confederate Army Captain William Alexander Campbell Jones on the main state road leading from Livingston to York, now U.S. Route 11 just south of Livingston.  It was built using hand-hewn yellow pine timbers joined together with large wooden pegs.  During the American Civil War, the bridge was used as an access route to Mississippi by Confederate forces led by General Nathan Bedford Forrest.

A concrete bridge replaced the Alamuchee-Bellamy Covered Bridge in 1924, and it was moved 5 miles (8 km) south to the old Bellamy-Livingston Road (now Bennett 13 Road, CR 13) over Alamuchee Creek (coordinates , or 32.522153, -88.186728), soon given the name "Alamuchee Covered Bridge".  The bridge remained in service to motor traffic until 1958, when it was once again replaced by a concrete bridge.  During that time, a logging truck being used to haul timbers from the construction site accidentally crashed into the bottom of the covered bridge.  As a result, the Alamuchee-Bellamy Covered Bridge was permanently closed and left unmaintained.

In 1971, the Sumter County Historical Society came to the rescue and fully restored the damaged bridge.  It was moved from Alamuchee Creek back into Livingston and placed over Duck Pond at what is now the University of West Alabama.  The bridge now serves as a campus access route for college students and also attracts visitors from various places to a longstanding piece of history in Sumter County.  It has been made wheelchair accessible, and also has lights inside the bridge for nighttime illumination.

The covered bridge underwent restoration in early 2017.

Famous Alabama hanging
Stephen S. Renfroe, known as "Alabama's Outlaw Sheriff", was hanged near the Alamuchee-Bellamy Covered Bridge outside Livingston by locals in July 1886.  During that time, the bridge was still located over the Sucarnoochee River and not Alamuchee Creek as some sources state.

See also
List of Alabama covered bridges
Clarkson–Legg Covered Bridge – bridge in Alabama, also with General Nathan Bedford Forrest

References

Further reading
 Dale J. Travis Covered Bridges. Alamuchee-Bellamy CB: Credits. Retrieved Aug. 23, 2007.
 Bridges to the Past: Alabama's Covered Bridges. Alamuchee-Bellamy CB: Credits. Retrieved Aug. 23, 2007.
 Alabama Bureau of Tourism & Travel. Alamuchee-Bellamy CB: Credits. Retrieved Aug. 23, 2007.
 The Decatur Daily. Alamuchee-Bellamy CB: Credits. Retrieved Aug. 23, 2007.
 Alabamiana: A Guide to Alabama. Alamuchee-Bellamy CB: Credits. Retrieved Aug. 23, 2007.
 Brad Campbell's Pages of Genealogy & History (Stephen S. Renfroe). Alamuchee-Bellamy CB: Credits. Retrieved Aug. 23, 2007.
 Brad Campbell's Pages of Genealogy & History (Alamuchee-Bellamy Bridge). Alamuchee-Bellamy CB: Credits. Retrieved Aug. 23, 2007.
 Ohio Barns: Covered Bridges. Alamuchee-Bellamy CB: Credits. Retrieved Aug. 23, 2007.
 University of West Alabama. Alamuchee-Bellamy CB: Credits. Retrieved Aug. 23, 2007.
 Bridgehunter.com. Alamuchee-Bellamy CB: Credits. Retrieved Aug. 14, 2013.

External links 
Bridges to the Past: Alabama's Covered Bridges
Alamuchee-Bellamy Covered Bridge (Dale J. Travis)

Covered bridges in Alabama
Bridges completed in 1861
Tourist attractions in Sumter County, Alabama
Road bridges in Alabama
Pedestrian bridges in Alabama
Former road bridges in the United States
1861 establishments in Alabama
Wooden bridges in Alabama
Lattice truss bridges in the United States
Buildings and structures in Sumter County, Alabama